John Edwards (October 24, 1815 – April 8, 1894) was an American Civil War brigadier general in the Union Army, an American politician and a U.S. Representative from Arkansas.

Biography
Born in Louisville, Kentucky, Edwards received a limited schooling, but he studied law and was admitted to the bar. He married Eliza Jane Knight on July 8, 1834 in, Lawrence, Indiana, and they had seven children: Eugene Edgar, John, Marcus, Mary W., Susan Huldah, William T., and Montgomery Gray. His second wife was Catherine Whisenand, and they were married on May 8, 1854 in Chariton, Iowa. They had three children: Nancy, Clarence B., and Alfred. On April 28, 1880, he married Mary Burland Bevans in Washington, D.C., and they had two daughters: Frances Sterling ("Fanny") and Mary Ellen ("Mamie").

Career
In order to live in a free state, Edwards moved to Indiana, where he served in the Indiana House of Representatives in 1845 and 1846. He had inherited slaves from his father's estate in Kentucky but freed them and gave them property with which to begin a new life in Indiana. He moved to California, and in 1849 was elected an alcalde.

Edwards returned to Indiana in 1852, and as a Whig, he served as member of the Indiana State Senate in 1853. In 1853 he moved to Chariton, Iowa, where he began the practice of law. In 1856 he was chosen a member of the convention which framed the new state constitution which was adopted the following year.  He was founder in 1857 of the Patriot newspaper, and became a Republican when that party was organized. In 1858 he was a member of the House of the Seventh General Assembly. He was reelected and in 1860 was chosen Speaker of the House of the Eighth General Assembly.

When the Civil War began Edwards was appointed as lieutenant colonel May 21, 1861 and served as aide on the staff of Governor Kirkwood of Iowa protecting the Missouri border from invasion. On August 8, 1862 he was commissioned colonel of the 18th Iowa Volunteer Infantry, serving through the war, after which he was brevetted brigadier general of volunteers to date from September 26, 1864.

After the war Edwards settled at Fort Smith, Arkansas, and was appointed by President Johnson as Assessor of Internal Revenue and served from August 15, 1866 to May 31, 1869. He was presented credentials of election as a Liberal Republican to the Forty-second Congress and served from March 4, 1871, to February 9, 1872, when he was succeeded by Thomas Boles, who contested the election.  Not a candidate for renomination, he settled in Washington, D.C..

Death
Edwards died in Washington, D.C., on April 8, 1894. He is buried at Arlington National Cemetery in Arlington, Virginia.

See also

List of American Civil War generals (Union)

References

External links

 Retrieved on 2008-08-11
The Iowa Legislature

1805 births
1894 deaths
Politicians from Fort Smith, Arkansas
Politicians from Louisville, Kentucky
Indiana Whigs
Iowa Republicans
Arkansas Republicans
Arkansas Liberal Republicans
Liberal Republican Party members of the United States House of Representatives
Members of the Indiana House of Representatives
Members of the United States House of Representatives from Arkansas
Indiana state senators
Members of the Iowa House of Representatives
Union Army generals
People of Iowa in the American Civil War
People from Chariton, Iowa
Burials at Arlington National Cemetery
19th-century American politicians